is a visual novel developed by Lose, which has also been adapted into the anime series . Maitetsu was initially released in Japan in 2016, and it was released internationally by Sekai Project on Steam in 2018. Sekai Project also released an uncensored, 18+ version of the game on Fakku. A sequel, Maitetsu: Last Run, was released in 2020.

Rail Romanesque, an anime spinoff of the game, was announced in 2019 and released in 2020. Outside of Japan, the anime was released by Crunchyroll and Funimation. A second season has been announced.

Plot
Maitetsu is set in an alternate reality of Japan named Hinomoto in which railway locomotives are paired up with "Raillords", anthropomorphized girls representing the locomotives. However, a new form of transportation later became popular, leaving railways in disuse. The game follows Sotetsu, who reawakens Hachiroku, the Raillord of steam locomotives No.8620. Sotetsu then works to help Hachiroku find her missing locomotive while trying to save his hometown from pollution.

The majority of the story is set in Ohitoyo, a fictitious city in Kyushu split in half by the Kuma River. The town is largely based on the real city of Hitoyoshi in Kumamoto.

Characters

Visual novel

Adopted son of a family of brewers. Was the victim of a railway accident of which he was the only survivor in his family. Sōtetsu later acts as Hibiki's secretary after she assumes her position as mayor.

Raillord accidentally awoken by Sōtetsu, having been stowed away in a cabinet for a long time. Speaks in a very refined and formal tone. She personifies the JGR Class 8620 2-6-0 Mogul-type steam locomotive; specifically, number 8620, the lead member of her class. Hachiroku also appears in the anime, but is unvoiced.

Stepsister of Sōtetsu who is also an aspiring artist. Noted as being very optimistic. Her speech often slips into a Kumamoto drawl; she will then attempt to correct it back into a more refined tone which she uses "as she is now older". She subsequently becomes the mayor of Ohitoyo.

Mayor of Ohitoyo and operator and caretaker of Reina. Noted as being very timid and is of Franc descent. Due to a harassment incident at a city council meeting involving an outside heckler, Paulette resigns as mayor of Ohitoyo due to the pressure; she then acts as a mentor for Hibiki after the latter takes up her position.

Raillord always noted as being in the company of Paulette. She is the personification of the JNR KiHa 07 series (ja) diesel railcar. Speaks extremely slowly and in a fashion similar to that of a toddler. Reina also appears in the anime, but is unvoiced.

Sōtetsu's adoptive older sister and the owner of the Migitachi Brewery. Speaks with a heavy Kumamoto drawl, has a very shapely figure and has a very sisterly personality.

Daughter of the owner of the Kumamoto Bank as well as a branch manager for the Ohitoyo branch. Noted as being the first to discover Hibiki's talent and is regarded as a "reliable senpai". Is very shrewd and astute. Once Hibiki assumes her position as mayor, Kisaki acts as one of her assistants.

An young tomboyish girl of who is very interested in swordplay. Acts as the poster girl for the Minakasa blacksmith shop.

An young girl of similar age to Nagi who manages the Kuma River Rafts. Is an introvert and often requires Nagi to speak for her.

A blacksmith who is the owner of the Minakasa blacksmith shop and Nagi's grandfather. Is noted as one of the few people remaining who has the skill to repair locomotives.

Head priest of a local shrine. Is often speculated to have had some experience in the operation of railroads.

An elderly woman who is the owner of the Tororuyu public bathhouse; her full name has never been revealed. Is said to have been a technician of the Imperial Railroad in the past.

Father of Kisaki Hōshō and president of the Kumamoto Bank. His wealth allows him to have great influence over numerous things.

Sentient navigation system of Sōtetsu's Aircra. Hachiroku was initially hostile towards her but slowly warmed up.

Fukami's grandfather; he used to be the leading crewman of the Kuma River Rafts. In retirement, he works voluntarily for the railroad as a patrolman.

Employee of an Aircra factory in Ohitoyo. Currently works at the Ohitoyo Branch of the Kumamoto Bank as Kisaki's secretary and personal assistant. Her androgynous appearance often leads her to be mistaken for a man.

Wife of the head priest of the Eizanji ghost temple. Formerly worked as kitchen staff on the Imperial Railroad; runs a crêpe and pastry shop in Ohitoyo in retirement.

Twin sister of Sōtetsu who died in a railway accident of which the latter was the only survivor in the family. Apparently not fully aware that she has died, she continuously wanders the trains around the area as a ghost.

A long-disused Raillord manufactured near the end of the Imperial Railway's existence. She is the personification of the JNR 181 series electric multiple unit, with her name being taken from the KuHa 26 control cars. Has a very aloof personality and speaks with a monotonous tone but has long desired to return to service. In her first few appearances, she obscures her face with white bandages.

A red fox which wanders around Ohitoyo Station. Communicates using yips.

Anime

Personification of the JNR Class C12 2-6-2T Prairie-type steam locomotive. She represents steam locomotive C12 67. Noted as eloquent and capable of leading.

Personification of the JNR Class D51 2-8-2 Mikado-type steam locomotive. She represents steam locomotive D51 840. Confident and passionate.

Personification of the JGR HoJi 6005 series steam railcar. She represents steam railcar HoJi 6016. Kiko is noted as being refined and partakes in luxurious activities.

Personification of the Kagoshima Kotsu KiHa 100 series diesel railcar. She represents diesel railcar KiHa 101. Highly competitive.

Personification of the Tobu Railway Class B1 4-4-0 American-type steam locomotive. She represents locomotive number 5. She is lazy, aloof and lacks any form of attention span.

Personification of the Iyo Railway Kou Type 1 0-4-0 steam locomotive. She represents locomotive number 1. She has a laid-back and friendly personality.

Personification of the Jōmō Electric Railway DeHa 100 series electric railcar. She represents locomotive DeHa 101. Has a motherly personality and is often very busy.

Personification of the JNR Class EF10 electric locomotive. She represents locomotive EF10 23. Very reserved; it often seems like she is in her own world.

Personification of the China Railway DF4 electric locomotive. She represents locomotive 4 2000. Very kind and always wants to learn more.

Personification of the JNR Class C11 2-6-4T Adriatic-type steam locomotive. She represents steam locomotive C11 202. She is slated to appear in the second season of the anime.

Anime
Rail Romanesque, an anime spinoff of Maitetsu featuring new characters, aired from October 3 to December 19, 2020 on Tokyo MX and other channels. The series was animated by the studio Saetta, and it was directed by Hisayoshi Hirasawa. The production held a crowdfunding campaign in July 2020. In September 2020, Tenka Hashimoto, who was initially cast to play the character Shirogane, stepped down from her role following professional controversy; she was replaced by Chihiro Kamijō.

On December 12, 2020, a second season was announced.

Two years later on October 7th, 2022 during the Lose Last Concert in Tokyo Dome City Hall, another announcement regarding the second season was made, officially being named "Rail Romanesque 2." Kaniko and 4 other raillords including a JNR Class 9600, JGR Class C51 and JNR Class D60 were revealed, with the announcement ending with the airing year to be 2023, though a month and date has not been revealed.

Notes

References

External links
  
  
 
 

2016 video games
2020 video games
Anime television series based on video games
Bishōjo games
Crunchyroll anime
Eroge
Fiction about rail transport
Funimation
Nintendo Switch games
PlayStation 4 games
Tokyo MX original programming
Video games developed in Japan
Visual novels
Windows games